The Richard Rodgers Award is an annual award presented by the American Academy of Arts and Letters, and was created and endowed by Richard Rodgers in 1978 for the development of new works in musical theatre. These awards provide financial support for full productions, studio productions, and staged readings of new and developing works of musical theatre, and to nurture early-career composers, lyricists and playwrights by enabling their musicals to be produced by nonprofit theatres in New York City. The winners are selected by a jury of the American Academy of Arts and Letters. The Richard Rodgers Awards are the Academy's only awards for which applications are accepted.

Former award recipients include Maury Yeston, for Nine; Jonathan Larson, for Rent; Julie Taymor and Elliot Goldenthal, for Juan Darien; Lynn Ahrens and Stephen Flaherty, for Lucky Stiff; Jeanine Tesori and Brian Crawley, for Violet; Scott Frankel, Michael Korie, and Doug Wright, for Grey Gardens; and Dave Malloy for Natasha, Pierre & the Great Comet of 1812.

2022's jury included David Lang, chairman, Lynn Ahrens, Kristoffer Diaz, Mindi Dickstein, Amanda Green, Michael R. Jackson, Richard Maltby, Jr., and John Weidman.

2022's winners are Driving in Circles by Jay Eddy; and Perpetual Sunshine & the Ghost Girls by Sara Cooper and Lynne Shankel.

Recipients

See also
 ASCAP Foundation Richard Rodgers New Horizons Award

References

General
 

Specific

External links
 American Academy of Arts and Letters' official site

Musical theatre awards
Awards established in 1978